Tidally detached exomoons, also known as orphaned exomoons or ploonets, are hypothetical exoplanets that were formerly exomoons of another planet, before being ejected from their orbits around their parent planets by tidal forces during planetary migration, and becoming planets in their own right. Researchers at Columbia University have suggested that a disrupting detached exomoon may be causing the unusual fluctuations in brightness exhibited by Tabby's Star.

The term ploonet, a blend of the words planet and moon, was first used in a 2019 paper in the Monthly Notices of the Royal Astronomical Society. It received attention from mainstream media sources, with CNET calling it "charmingly goofy".

See also

References 

Exomoons